Chinese sticky rice ( or  ) is Chinese rice dish commonly made from glutinous rice and can include soy sauce, oyster sauce, scallions, cilantro and other ingredients.

The dish is commonly served in dim sum.

See also
Lo mai gai
Zongzi

References

Rice dishes
Chinese cuisine